Jamie Lee Kah (born 7 December 1995) is an Australian jockey. Since October 2020 she has been the world's top-ranked female jockey. In 2020/21 she became the first jockey to ride 100 winners in a Melbourne Metropolitan racing season.

Life and career
Jamie Kah's parents John and Karen are former speed skaters who represented Australia at the Winter Olympics. She grew up in Mount Pleasant in the Adelaide Hills in South Australia, where she began working at a friend's stables when she was 13. She began her riding apprenticeship in 2011, rode her first race in March 2012 at Streaky Bay, and rode her first winner 14 days later at the Easter Saturday meeting at Clare.

In her first full season, 2012/13, Kah won the Adelaide Jockeys' Premiership. She won the Premiership for a third time in 2017/18, then moved to Melbourne in January 2019, and won her first Group One race on Harlem in the Australian Cup at Flemington in March. 

In October 2020 Kah was ranked the leading female jockey in the world, and 77th jockey overall. In February 2021 she was the world's 41st jockey overall, and the only female jockey in the top 100. She rode her 1000th winner at the Pakenham racecourse on Wednesday, 12 May 2021. By mid-March 2023 she had ridden 1,191 winners, including nine Group One winners. 

On 10 July 2021, Kah became the first jockey to ride 100 winners in a Melbourne Metropolitan racing season. She finished the Metropolitan season with 105 winners. 

In September 2021 she was suspended for five months by the Victorian Racing Tribunal for breaching COVID-19 regulations and for providing false or misleading evidence to the breach investigation. She appealed against the severity of the penalty to the Victorian Supreme Court, which upheld her appeal on 17 November, freeing her to resume riding.

For some years Kah and Clayton Douglas, a fellow jockey and trainer, had a property on the Mornington Peninsula. As of March 2023 she and fellow jockey Ben Melham are partners.

On 29 January 2023, Kah won the Hong Kong Classic Mile on Voyage Bubble. She suffered serious injuries in a fall during a race at Flemington on 11 March 2023, and spent several days under sedation at the Royal Melbourne Hospital.

References

1995 births
Living people
Sportswomen from South Australia
Australian female jockeys